Harold Saul Guskin (May 25, 1941 – May 10, 2018) was an American actor and acting coach. He coached Glenn Close, James Gandolfini and Gabriel Macht.

Early life 
He learned playing the trombone in high school but replaced it with theatre, then he started attending acting classes and did bachelor's degree in drama at Rutgers University, then earned a master's from Indiana University.

Career 

In 1970, Guskin began teaching at Illinois Wesleyan University in Bloomington, then moved to the New York University Tisch School of the Arts, where he was not happy with academic world. In the 1980 he joined the Public Theater for three years where he did workshops to introduced his acting techniques.

He published a book "How to Stop Acting" (2003) a book about acting techniques.

Death 
On May 10, 2018, he died in Park Ridge, New Jersey. His wife reported the cause of death as a pulmonary embolism. He had contracted primary progressive aphasia, a rare form of dementia, over decade before his death.

References 

1941 births
2018 deaths
American male film actors
American acting coaches
20th-century American male actors
Male actors from New York City
Deaths from pulmonary embolism
Tisch School of the Arts faculty
Illinois Wesleyan University faculty
Indiana University alumni
Rutgers University alumni